The second season of The CW series Batwoman premiered on January 17, 2021. The series is based on the DC Comics character of the same name and set in the Arrowverse continuity. Caroline Dries, who developed the series, returned as showrunner for the season. It is the first season to star Javicia Leslie as Ryan Wilder, a vigilante who succeeds Kate Kane in the role of Batwoman. The main cast also features Rachel Skarsten, Meagan Tandy, Nicole Kang, Camrus Johnson, and Dougray Scott returning from the previous season.

The season was ordered in January 2020 and production began in September. Before the beginning of production, season one star Ruby Rose announced that she would not return to the role of Kate. The character Ryan was created by the series to become the new Batwoman, with Leslie being cast in July. The role of Kate was later recast to Wallis Day, justified in-narrative as Kate being caught in a plane crash and being given plastic surgery to resemble Circe Sionis, the deceased daughter of Black Mask, while also being hypnotized into being her.

Episodes

Cast and characters

Main
 Javicia Leslie as Ryan Wilder / Batwoman
 Rachel Skarsten as Beth Kane / Alice
 Meagan Tandy as Sophie Moore
 Nicole Kang as Mary Hamilton
 Camrus Johnson as Luke Fox / Batwing
 Dougray Scott as Jacob Kane

Recurring
 Rachel Maddow as the voice of Vesper Fairchild
 Allison Riley as Dana DeWitt
 Rebecca Davis as Susan Stevens
 Christina Wolfe as Julia Pennyworth
 Leah Gibson as Tatiana / The Whisper
 Shivani Ghai as Safiyah Sohail
 Bevin Bru as Angelique Martin
 Nathan Owens as Ocean
 Peter Outerbridge as Roman Sionis / Black Mask
 Wallis Day as Kate Kane / "Circe Sionis"
 Laura Mennell as Dr. Evelyn Rhyme / Enigma
 Jesse Hutch as Russell Tavaroff

Guest 
 Shakura S'Aida as Cora Lewis
 Sam Littlefield as Jonathan Cartwright / Mouse
 Warren Christie as Tommy Elliot / Hush and Bruce Wayne
 Alex Morf as Victor Zsasz
 Linda Kash as Candice "Candy Lady" Long
 Aason Nadjiwon as Rudy
 Eli Tsepsio Lamour as Kevin Johnson
 Donny Lucas as Garrett Hang
 Scott Pocha as Pike
 Lincoln Clauss as Evan Blake / Wolf Spider
 R. J. Fetherstonhaugh as Aaron Helzinger / Amygdala
 Milo Shandel as Dr. Ethan Rogers
 Gracyn Shinyei as young Kate Kane
 Ava Sleeth as young Beth Kane
 Jaime M. Callica as Horten Spence
 Samantha Liana Cole as Imani
 Rick Miller as Arthur Brown / Cluemaster
 Morgan Kohan as Stephanie Brown
 Kaiden Berge as Eli
 Domonique Adam as Lucius Fox
 David Ramsey as John Diggle

Production

Development
In January 2020, The CW renewed the series for a second season. Caroline Dries returned as showrunner.

Writing
In May 2020, ahead of the season one finale, Caroline Dries announced that Safiyah Sohail would be the Big Bad of season two. Though the character was referenced multiple times in season one, Dries said they "didn't want to waste her or blow out her character in Season 1 when there are all these other hijinks happening", so it was decided to preserve her debut in season two. As the last two planned episodes of the first season could not be filmed due to the COVID-19 pandemic causing production to be shut down, they were changed to be part of season two. Dries said the scripts of those episodes may undergo tinkering. Dries later announced that the season would have another Big Bad in the form of Black Mask.

Casting
Main cast members Rachel Skarsten, Meagan Tandy, Nicole Kang, Camrus Johnson and Dougray Scott will return as Beth Kane / Alice, Sophie Moore, Luke Fox and Jacob Kane. In May 2020, Ruby Rose, who portrayed the title role of Kate Kane / Batwoman in the first season, announced she would be leaving the series ahead of its second season; no reason was initially given for her departure. It was mutually decided between Rose, the studio, and the network for her to leave. In August, Rose called being the lead of a series "taxing" and stated her back surgery following an on-set accident in 2019 was a contributing factor in deciding to leave, saying it was "time for me to take a break to fully heal and then return" to acting. Spending time in isolation because of the pandemic also allowed Rose "to just think about a lot of different things and what you want to achieve in life and what you want to do," which allowed her "a great opportunity to have a dialogue about a lot of things" with the producers.

In June, Dries said it was discussed to replace Rose as Kate Kane, as "it would be seamless" for some of the episodes already written. However, with guidance from Greg Berlanti, it was decided to move forward with an entirely new character invented for the series as Batwoman, which would "also respect everything that Ruby put into the Kate Kane character." Dries also felt by using a new character, "it helps the audience" so the writers would not have to "address the elephant in the room". She also revealed Kate would not be killed and her disappearance would be a key storyline during season two. Immediately after Rose's departure, the producers reaffirmed their commitment to the series and finding a new actress of the LGBTQ community to lead future seasons. In July, Javicia Leslie was cast as Ryan Wilder, the new Batwoman.

In September 2020, Shivani Ghai was cast as Safiyah Sohail, Leah Gibson was cast as Tatiana / The Whisper, and Nathan Owens was cast as Ocean, all in recurring roles. In December 2020, David Ramsey was revealed to be reprising his Arrow role of John Diggle in the season. On March 21, 2021, Wallis Day was announced to replace Ruby Rose as Kate Kane with a new face.

Filming
Filming for the second season began on September 3, 2020. By September 29, filming was shut down because of delays in receiving COVID-19 test results for the cast and crew, but they were given clearance to resume filming a week later. Filming concluded on May 10, 2021.

Broadcast
The second season premiered on January 17, 2021. Episodes continued to be released weekly on Sundays until June 27, 2021.

Reception

Ratings

Critical response

On review aggregator Rotten Tomatoes, the season holds an approval rating of 89% based on 18 reviews, with an average rating of 7.25/10. The website's critical consensus reads, "Batwoman's second season survives a soft reboot, maintaining the show's excellence while giving Javicia Leslie plenty of room to spread her wings."

Notes

References

2021 American television seasons
Batwoman (TV series) seasons
Television productions suspended due to the COVID-19 pandemic